KXRJ (91.9 FM) is a radio station licensed to Russellville, Arkansas, United States, the station serves the Arkansas college area.  The station is currently owned by Arkansas Tech University.

References

External links

XRJ
Arkansas Tech University
College radio stations in Arkansas